Odense Atletikstadion is a multi-use stadium in Odense, Denmark.  It is used mostly for athletics and even some football matches and served as the home stadium of FC Fyn. The stadium holds 8,000 people.

References

Football venues in Denmark